Hatfield Cemetery may refer to:

Hatfield Cemetery (Newtown, West Virginia), listed on the US National Register of Historic Places (NRHP)
Hatfield Cemetery (Sarah Ann, West Virginia), NRHP-listed